Pilz (German for ‘mushroom’) was a German record label, set up in Berlin in 1971 by German music mogul Rolf-Ulrich Kaiser, who also established the label Ohr.

History
Pilz was a sublabel of BASF, a major record company in Germany at that time. A number of artists who released records on Pilz, such as Witthuser & Westrupp, also put out music on Ohr and/or Cosmic Couriers, another of Kaiser’s record labels.

The label’s logo was a mushroom, found on the sleeves and on the labels of the records. In all, there were 20 albums and 7 singles released on Pilz. Most were psychedelic or cosmic rock with folk influences. Lyrics/vocals were sometimes in German, although some of the albums were purely instrumental.

Popol Vuh are probably the best known of Pilz artists, having released numerous albums during their career, including several film scores, many of them highly regarded by critics and fans. ‘In Der Garten Pharoas’ is considered a classic by many. Wallenstein  had some success during the 70s and in more recent years with reissues, while Witthuser & Westrupp’s albums remain cult favourites. Popol Vuh’s ‘Hosianna Mantra’ was the final release before the label folded in 1972. ‘Hosianna Mantra’ has been covered in its entirety by Kawabata Makoto of Acid Mothers Temple.

Discography 

 Catalog number - Artist, Title, Year

Albums
 15 21114-2 - Various Artists, Heavy Christmas, 1971
 20 20114-7 - Dies Irae, First, 1971
 20 21088-2 - Flute & Voice, Imaginations of Light, 1971
 20 21090-1 - Joy Unlimited, Schmetterlinge, 1971
 20 21095-2 - Ardo Dombec, Ardo Dombec , 1971
 20 21098-7 - Witthüser & Westrupp, Der Jesuspilz - Musik vom Evangelium, 1971
 20 21099-5 - Rufus Zuphall, Phallobst, 1971
 20 21100-2 - Bröselmaschine, Bröselmaschine, 1971
 20 21102-9 - Virus, Thoughts, 1971
 20 21103-7 - McChurch Soundroom, Delusion, 1971
 20 21276-9 - Popol Vuh, In den Gärten Pharaos , 1971
 20 21314-5 - Hölderlin, Hölderlins Traum, 1972
 20 29064-6 - Wallenstein, Blitzkrieg, 1972
 20 29077-8 - Emtidi, Saat, 1972
 20 29097-2 - Anima, Anima, 1972
 20 29113-8 - Wallenstein, Mother Universe, 1972
 20 29115-4 - Witthüser & Westrupp, Bauer Plath, 1972
 20 29116-2 - Various Artists, Rapunzel - Neue Deutsche Volksmusik, 1972
 20 29131-6 - Jerry Berkers, Unterwegs, 1972
 20 29143-1 - Popol Vuh, Hosianna Mantra, 1972
Singles
 05 10147-3 - Elga, Cajun Man / Streets of London, 1971
 05 11101-0 - Virus, King Heroin / Take Your Thoughts, 1971
 05 11106-1 - Dies Irae, Lucifer / Tired, 1971
 05 19041-7 - Witthüser & Westrupp, Die Erleuchtung / Die Aussendung, 1971
 05 11556-3 - Joy Unlimited, Early Morning Moanin' / Proud Angelina, 1972
 05 19128-6 - Jerry Berkers, Na na na chu chu chu / Es wird morgen vorbei sein, 1972
 05 19134-0 - Witthüser & Westrupp, Bauer Plath / Das Lied der Liebe, 1972

See also 
 List of record labels

Further reading
 Julian Cope 'Krautrocksampler' (Head Heritage 1995)

External links
midsuffolk.unisonplus.net discography
 collectable-records.ru another Pilz Records Discography 
 

German record labels
Progressive rock record labels
Record labels established in 1971